The Battle of Živohošť took place on 4 November 1419. Hussite pilgrims from Alttabor (Czech: Sezimovo Ústí) came to the countrywide congress in Prague, where they fought the Czech Catholic nobility following King Sigismund of Luxembourg and under the command of Peter Konopišťský of Sternberg. After the first attack, a number of the Hussites were killed, wounded, or captured, but the West Bohemian Hussite reinforcements that arrived from the battlefield from Nový Knín led the Czech barons to retreat to Kuttenberg. According to the testimony of contemporary written sources, the battle at Živohoště was the first major battle of the Hussite Wars.

References
 Čornej, Peter. Velké dějiny zemí Koruny české V. 1402-1437. Prague: Paseka, 2000. 790 pp. .
 Lenková, Jitka; Pavlík, Václav. Nejdůležitější bitvy v českých dějinách. 1st ed. Frýdek-Mistek: Alpress, 2007. 294 pp. .
 Macek, Josef. Tabor Hussite revolutionary movement in the first part. Prague: Equality, 1956. 395 pp.
 Palacký, František. Dějiny národu českého v Čechách a v Moravě. Prague: B. Koci, 1907. 1279 pp.
 Šmahel, František. Husitská revoluce 3: Kronika válečných let. Prague: Karolinum, 1996. 420 pp. .

1419 in Europe
Zivohoste 1419
Zivohoste 1419
Živohoště
Conflicts in 1419
History of the Central Bohemian Region